Arthur Weed Marvin (May 26, 1859 – January 18, 1911), was an American cinematographer who worked for the American Mutoscope and Biograph Company in which his brother Harry Marvin was one of the four founders (the others being Herman Casler, William Kennedy Laurie Dickson, and Elias Koopman). 

He shot 418 films between 1897 and 1911, including The Adventures of Dollie (1908), the directorial debut of D. W. Griffith, as well as other early Griffith shorts such as Pippa Passes in 1909.

He directed the short film Sherlock Holmes Baffled, which was the earliest known film to feature Arthur Conan Doyle's detective character Sherlock Holmes.

His nephew Daniel Warner Marvin II, Henry's son, perished in the sinking of the RMS Titanic in 1912.

He was born in Warners, New York, US to Daniel Warner Marvin and Ellen Jane Weed. He was married to Sarah E. Babcock. He died in Los Angeles, California.

Filmography

References

External links

1859 births
1911 deaths
American cinematographers